This article contains opinion polling by U.S. state for the 2012 Republican Party presidential primaries.

As of May 2012, both Ron Paul and Mitt Romney have led polls in multiple states. They have both also reached at least 20 percent in polls in multiple states. Before announcing that they would not run, Mike Huckabee and Sarah Palin were also leading polls in multiple states with numbers above 20 percent. Michele Bachmann, Herman Cain, Rick Perry, and Rick Santorum were also able to lead polls in multiple states earlier in the race, but Cain suspended his campaign on December 3 after multiple allegations of sexual impropriety, Bachmann dropped out on January 4, one day after her poor showing in the Iowa caucuses, in which she came in sixth place and received just 5 percent of the vote, Perry dropped out on January 19 after finishing fifth in Iowa with just over 10 percent of the vote, finishing sixth in New Hampshire with less than 1 percent of the vote and with "lagging" poll numbers ahead of the South Carolina primary, and Santorum suspended his campaign on April 10. Newt Gingrich announced he would drop out of the race after a poor showing in the northeast on April 24.

Haley Barbour of Mississippi, Jeb Bush of Florida, Chris Christie of New Jersey, Jim DeMint of South Carolina, Bobby Jindal of Louisiana, Tim Pawlenty of Minnesota, Paul Ryan of Wisconsin and John Thune of South Dakota all succeeded in leading polls in their home states at some point in 2011, although only Pawlenty actually launched a campaign. Pawlenty exited the race on August 14, one day after finishing third in Iowa's Ames Straw Poll, citing a lack of campaign funds.

Polling for completed primaries

California (June 5)
Winner  Mitt Romney
Primary date June 5, 2012
Delegates 172

Montana (June 5)
Winner  Mitt Romney
Primary date June 5, 2012
Delegates 26

New Jersey (June 5)
Winner  Mitt Romney
Primary date June 5, 2012
Delegates 50

New Mexico (June 5)
Winner  Mitt Romney
Primary date June 5, 2012
Delegates 23

South Dakota (June 5)
Winner  Mitt Romney
Primary date June 5, 2012
Delegates 28

Utah (June 26)
Winner  Mitt Romney
Primary date June 26, 2012
Delegates 40

See also
Results of the 2012 Republican Party presidential primaries
Straw polls for the Republican Party presidential primaries, 2012
Nationwide opinion polling for the Republican Party 2012 presidential primaries

References

Opinion polling for the 2012 United States presidential election